The 1st constituency of Saint-Pierre-et-Miquelon is a French legislative constituency on the islands of Saint-Pierre-et-Miquelon. It is the islands' only constituency and also the least populated constituency in France with only 5,997 inhabitants in 2017.

Deputies

Election results

2022

2017

2014 by-election

On 9 April 2014, Annick Girardin was appointed Secretary of State for Development and Francophonie in the cabinet of Prime Minister Manuel Valls. Catherine Pen, her suppléant (substitute), took over the seat but resigned on the same day due to health problems. A by-election was called and Girardin was again a candidate. She won on the first round on 29 June 2014. She kept her ministerial post and her substitute  Stéphane Claireaux took the seat on 30 July.

2012

2007

2002

1997

References

Sources
 Official results of French elections from 1998: 

French legislative constituencies
Politics of Saint Pierre and Miquelon
Government of Saint Pierre and Miquelon